The P series is a chronological progression of prototype humanoid robots as developed by Honda. The research conducted allowed the eventual creation of ASIMO, the world's most advanced humanoid robot of its time. Honda Motor's President and CEO Hiroyuki Yoshino, at the time, described Honda's humanoid robotics program as consistent with its direction to enhance human mobility.

History 
Work to develop an advanced humanoid robot began in 1986, when Honda established a research center focused on fundamental technologies, including humanoid robotics.

Honda engineers had to research how humans walk, using the human skeleton for reference to create a replica and have it function like a human being. In 1986, the first two-legged robot was made to walk, used by Honda engineers to establish stable walking technology, including steps and sloped surfaces.

In 1993, Honda began developing "Prototype" models ("P" series), attaching the legs to a torso with arms that could perform basic tasks. P2, the second prototype model, debuted in December 1996, using wireless techniques making it the first self-regulating, two-legged walking robot. P2 weighed 463 pounds with a height of six feet tall. In September 1997, P3 was introduced as the first completely independent bi-pedal humanoid walking robot, standing five feet, four inches tall and weighing 287 pounds.

Features 
Honda engineers determined a robot should be easy to operate and small in size, enabling it to help people—for instance, to look eye to eye with someone sitting in a chair.

ASIMO's unique attributes include Honda's intelligent, real-time, flexible walking technology which enables the robot to walk and turn smoothly and continuously. The new system also gives ASIMO greater stability in response to sudden movements. Through "predicted movement control" ASIMO can predict its next movement in real time and shift its center of gravity in anticipation of a turn. Further, ASIMO's stride can be adjusted real time, allowing it to walk faster or slower without requiring stored walking patterns as with previous robots.

ASIMO can be controlled by a portable controller whereas P3 was controlled from a workstation.

New Advancements 
The latest technological advancements enable ASIMO to move more freely in "3D" environments. This new technology enables ASIMO to navigate irregular configurations, walk up and down long staircases, and turn on the spot on slopes that require a change in posture with every step.

ASIMO can now correct its own foot placement position and body direction one step at a time, creating its specific route independently, and more efficiently. In addition to commands from a PC, it is now possible to use voice commands to control arm and hand motions and locomotion.

The technologies required to realize these capabilities were developed;

 High level postural balancing capability which enables the robot to maintain its posture by putting out its leg in an instant.
 External recognition capability which enables the robot to integrate information such as movements of people around it.
 Capability to generate autonomous behavior which enables the robot to make predictions from gathered information and determine the next behavior with being controlled by an operator.

The P series is a chronological progression of prototype humanoid robots as developed by Honda. The research conducted allowed the eventual creation of ASIMO.

P1 developed in 1993
P2 unveiled in 1996
P3 unveiled in 1997

Notes:
1. – The P1 was developed in 1993 but was not unveiled and Honda kept its existence a secret until the announcement of the P2 in 1996.
2. – The P4 was developed in 2000 and originally unveiled as "P3-improved prototype". The model was announced as the "P4" in 2009.

See also 
 Honda E series, experimental models
 Humanoid Robotics Project; the HRP-1 is a variant of the Honda P3.

References

External links 

P2/P3 Major Specifications (archive)

Robotics at Honda
Bipedal humanoid robots
1993 robots
1996 robots
1997 robots
2000 disestablishments
Japanese inventions